Reilly Township may refer to the following townships in the United States:

 Reilly Township, Butler County, Ohio
 Reilly Township, Schuylkill County, Pennsylvania